Orangia is a genus of small air-breathing land snails, terrestrial pulmonate gastropod mollusks in the family Charopidae or in Endodontidae.

Species
Species within the genus Orangia include:
 Orangia cookei
 Orangia maituatensis
 Orangia sporadica

References

 Nomenclator Zoologicus info

 
Taxonomy articles created by Polbot